
Trial of the century is an idiomatic phrase used to describe certain well-known court cases, especially of the 19th, 20th and 21st century. It is often used popularly as a rhetorical device to attach importance to a trial and as such is not an objective observation but the opinion of whoever uses it. As attorney F. Lee Bailey and The Washington Post observed in 1999:

In 1907, Harry K. Thaw was tried for the murder of Stanford White. Irvin S. Cobb, a contemporary reporter, explained why the trial fascinated the country so much:

List of cases
There are countless trials that have been labeled "the trial of the century" by the press; it is beyond the scope of this article to list them here. However, some legal scholars have labeled a few trials as "trials of the century". These cases are useful in this context for listing some of the most important trials, which include:

19th century
Trial of Lizzie Borden for the double murder of her father and stepmother (1893)
Trial of Alfred Dreyfus for treason (Dreyfus Affair) (1894–1899)

20th century
Trial of Leon Czolgosz for the assassination of United States President William McKinley (1901)
Trial of Harry Thaw for the murder of Stanford White (1906)
Trial of Bill Haywood for murder (1907)
Sacco and Vanzetti murder trial (1920–1927)
Trial of Roscoe Arbuckle for the rape and murder of Virginia Rappe (1921)
Leopold and Loeb murder trial (1924)
Scopes Monkey Trial (1925)
Hall-Mills murder case (1926)
Scottsboro Boys trials (1931–1937)
Lindbergh kidnapping trial (1935)
Nuremberg trials (1945–1946)
Victor Kravchenko versus Les Lettres Françaises (1949)
 Hiss-Chambers (Hiss Case, Hiss Affair) (1948–1950)
Julius and Ethel Rosenberg espionage trial (1951)
Sam Sheppard trials (1954–1966)
Adolf Eichmann trial (1961)
Chicago Seven trial (1969)
Charles Manson and Manson "family" for the Tate–LaBianca murders (1970)
Trial of Jeremy Thorpe for conspiring to murder Norman Josiffe (Thorpe affair) (1979)
Ted Bundy Chi Omega Trial (1979)
Claus von Bülow trials (1982–1985)
Klaus Barbie trial (1987)
Trial of Nicolae and Elena Ceaușescu (1989)
Trial of Lyle and Erik Menendez (1990)
Wisconsin v. Dahmer (1992)
Rodney King beating trials (1992–1993)
Trial of Mayor Antonio Sanchez for the rape and murder of Eileen Sarmenta and Allan Gomez (1993–1995)
Trial of Hubert Webb for the Vizconde massacre case (1995–2000)
O. J. Simpson murder case trial (1995)
Trial of Yolanda Saldívar (1995)
Impeachment of Bill Clinton (1999)

21st century
Bush v. Gore case that ended the recount in Florida (2000)
Trial of Joseph Estrada (2001–2007)
Trial of Slobodan Milošević (2002–2005)
Trial of Saddam Hussein (2004–2006)
Trial of Michael Jackson (2005)
Trial of the Ampatuan family for the Maguindanao massacre case (2010–2019)
Trial of Casey Anthony for the death of Caylee Anthony (2011)
Trial of Bo Xilai (2013)
Trial of Joaquín Guzmán Loera (2018–2019)
Trial of Catalonia independence leaders (2019)
Impeachment Trials of Donald Trump (2020, 2021)
Trial of Derek Chauvin (2021)
Trial of Kyle Rittenhouse (2021)
Depp v. Heard defamation trial (2022)
Trial of Alex Murdaugh (2023)

See also

Cause célèbre
Crime of the century
Lists of landmark court decisions
Media circus
Trial by media

References

External links
MSNBC survey on the topic from 2000
"(The Last) Trial of the Century!" by Peter Carlson via The Washington Post, January 4, 1999; Page C01 
20 "Trials of the Century" in the 20th century

English-language idioms
English phrases